The 2018 Ottawa Redblacks season was the fifth season for the team in the Canadian Football League. The Redblacks improved upon their 8–9–1 record from 2017, winning their ninth game against the Hamilton Tiger-Cats in an October 19 game, and finished with an 11–7 record. The team clinched a playoff berth and home playoff game for the fourth season in a row following the Toronto Argonauts' week 17 loss on October 6, 2018. After defeating the Tiger-Cats in the East Final, the Redblacks played in their third Grey Cup championship in four years, but lost to the Calgary Stampeders in the 106th Grey Cup game. This was the fifth season with Marcel Desjardins as general manager and Rick Campbell as head coach.

Off-season

Open Tryout Sessions 
On February 15, 2018, the Redblacks announced they would be holding open tryouts across North America during the spring. The dates and locations are listed in the table below:

Coaching Staff 
On November 29, 2017 the Redblacks announced they would not bring back four of their assistant coaches (Travis Moore, Bryan Chiu, Derek Oswalt & Ike Charlton) from the previous season. On December 4, 2017 the Redblacks announced the hire of Noel Thorpe as defensive coordinator (Thorpe will double as the defensive backs coach as well). Mark Nelson, who had been the team's defensive coordinator for four seasons, will remain with the club as a linebackers coach. Thorpe had been the defensive coordinator and assistant head coach of the Montreal Alouettes for the previous five seasons.

Free-Agency 
The 2018 CFL free agency period officially opened at 12:00pm EST on February 13, 2018. Key transactions are listed below:

Retained

Additions

Departed

CFL draft 
The 2018 CFL Draft took place on May 3, 2018. The Redblacks held seven selections in the eight round draft after trading their fifth-round pick to Calgary for Drew Tate and forfeiting their sixth-round pick after selecting Austin Reuland in the 2017 Supplemental Draft. They then acquired another fourth-round pick after trading Jake Ceresna to Edmonton for Odell Willis and then trading Willis to the BC Lions for the draft pick.

Preseason

Schedule 

 Games played with colour uniforms.

Regular season

Standings

Schedule 

 Games played with colour uniforms.
 Games played with white uniforms.

Post-season

Schedule 
With their victory over the Hamilton Tiger-Cats, the Ottawa Redblacks clinched their third Grey Cup birth in four years having won the 2016 Championship Game in Toronto. Trevor Harris threw a playoff record six touchdown passes in the game, surpassing a record Anthony Calvillo set in the 2009 East Final against the BC Lions. With the victory, the Redblacks qualified to play the Calgary Stampeders in the 106th Grey Cup, a re-match of the game from two years prior. The Redblacks lost 27-16 in a game that they never had the lead against the heavily favoured Stampeders.

 Games played with colour uniforms.
 Games played with white uniforms.

Team

Roster

Coaching staff

References 

2018 Canadian Football League season by team
2018 in Ontario
Ottawa Redblacks seasons